Chautauqua Pavilion may refer to:

Chautauqua Pavilion (Riverton, Iowa), listed on the National Register of Historic Places in Fremont County, Iowa
Chautauqua Pavilion (Hastings, Nebraska), listed on the National Register of Historic Places in Adams County, Nebraska